The University of Guelph-Humber (UofGH) is a collaboration between the University of Guelph and Humber College.

History

The university was established in 2000 by a partnership of the University of Guelph and Humber College. The official website of the university says that it was created to "produce a well-prepared university graduate". It is located on Humber College's North Campus in the Etobicoke district of Toronto, Ontario, Canada.

Organization

The university offers seven four-year undergraduate academic programs, each of which grants a university honours degree from the University of Guelph and a college diploma from Humber College. The campus of Guelph-Humber is also home to the University of Guelph's MFA program.

Academics

Admission
When the university opened, it was intended for 2,000 students, but it has since seen a growing number of applicants.  In 2014, the university saw a 19% increase in applicants, when student confirmations were dropping overall at Ontario universities. According to the official website of the university, its programs' estimated cutoff range is 75%–80%. However, the university's vice-provost, John Walsh, said to the Toronto Sun in 2016 that the university's incoming average is 80% for all programs.

Reputation
Maclean's magazine described Guelph-Humber programs as a "standout program" of the University of Guelph. Faze ranked the university's "Media Studies" program as one of the best journalism school in Canada. The university's "very low" attrition rate and "phenomenally high" four-year completion rate make it popular among students.

Undergraduate programs
 Business
 Early Childhood Studies
 Community Social Services
 Justice Studies
 Kinesiology
 Media and Communication Studies
 Psychology

Campus life

Student government
Guelph-Humber's student government is Ignite. Students of Guelph-Humber can also apply to the University of Guelph's senate.

Each of the seven programs at Guelph-Humber has an Academic Program Representative (APR) whose role it is to sit on committees with the administration, work with the other elected officials on campus and be the voice of the students in their program. APRs are the third representative for Guelph-Humber students beyond Board of Directors with Ignite and Senators with University of Guelph.

Societies
Alpha Phi Sigma
DECA U
Early Childhood Studies (ECS) Society
FCSS Society
Guelph-Humber Accounting Council (GHAC)
Guelph-Humber Advertising & Marketing Association (GHAMA)
Guelph-Humber Business Council (GHBC)
Guelph-Humber Consulting Association (GHCA)
Guelph-Humber Entrepreneurs Society (GHES)
Guelph-Humber Finance Society (GHFS)
Guelph-Humber Pre-Law Society (GHPLS)
GuHu Media
International Business Association
Kinesiology Society
Psi Chi (International Honour Society in Psychology)
Psych Society
Women in Business Society (WIBS)

Plant Wall

Guelph-Humber's Plant Wall is a new form of technology that uses a biological system to filter indoor air. The tropical plants that thrive on the four-storey wall are exposed to nearly a full day of sunlight from the large windows and rooftop skylights. The wall has an area of approximately 150 square meters and consists of roughly over 1,000 individual living plants. It acts as a bio-filter and purifies the air that circulates around the building. Working like a humidifier, the wall warms the air in the winter and cools the building's air during the summer. The living wall also reduces the threat of airborne pollutants simply by creating a more esthetically pleasing environment. The wall also saves energy by lowering the need to bring new air into the building.

Academic affiliation

Guelph-Humber has no degree or college diploma granting power. Graduates receive degrees from the University of Guelph and diplomas from Humber College. Academic faculty and staff are jointly hired by both the university and the college. Guelph-Humber graduates receive alumni benefit cards from the University of Guelph. Sometime outside sources describe Guelph-Humber as part of the Guelph; Mcleans in its university ranking called Guelph-Humber's programs "standout programs of the University of Guelph".

Notable alumni
 Suze Morrison - Member of the Ontario Provincial Parliament
 Jackie Perez - television personality
 Kaleed Rasheed - MPP for Mississauga East—Cooksville
 Mark Saunders - Toronto Police Chief; Bachelor of Applied Arts in Justice Studies
 Brendan Dunlop - Television personality
 Kristin Fairlie - Actor/Voice Actor/Singer

References

External links 

University of Guelph
Humber College
Educational institutions established in 2002
2002 establishments in Ontario
Universities and colleges in Toronto
Education in Etobicoke